Sphenophorus aequalis, the clay-coloured billbug, is a species of beetle in the family Dryophthoridae. It is found in North America.

Subspecies
These five subspecies belong to the species Sphenophorus aequalis:
 Sphenophorus aequalis aequalis Gyllenhal, 1838
 Sphenophorus aequalis ochreus
 Sphenophorus aequalis pictus
 Sphenophorus aequalis scirpi Chittenden
 Sphenophorus aequalis univitta Chittenden

References

Further reading

 
 

Dryophthorinae
Articles created by Qbugbot
Beetles described in 1838